Gérard Biguet (born 16 June 1946 in Jarny) is a retired French football referee, who refereed one match at the 1992 UEFA European Football Championship: CIS versus Germany.

He is known to have served as a FIFA referee during the period from 1982 to 1992. Biguet officiated at the 1988 Olympic tournament in Seoul, the 1983 FIFA World Youth Championship, qualifying matches for the Euro 1984 and Euro 1992 tournaments, and qualifying matches for the 1990 World Cup.

Biguet also worked as a futsal referee, officiating at the 1989 FIFA Futsal World Championship.

References

External links
Profile

1946 births
French football referees
Living people
UEFA Euro 1992 referees